Lynne M. Tracy is an American diplomat who is the United States ambassador to Russia, serving since January 2023. She formerly served as the United States ambassador to Armenia from 2019 to 2022.

Early life and education
Tracy was born in Barberton, Ohio, one of three daughters of Albert and Carol Pontius Tracy. She earned a B.A. in Soviet Studies from the University of Georgia in 1986, and a J.D. in 1994 from the University of Akron School of Law.

Career
Embarking on a career in Foreign Service Tracy served in a variety of international assignments, focused especially in Central and South Asia, including deputy chief of mission in the embassy in Ashgabat, Turkmenistan, principal officer in Peshawar, Pakistan from 1995 to 1997, and principal officer in Astana, Kazakhstan. Tracy served as political officer in Kabul from 2002 to 2003, consular officer in Bishkek, Kyrgyzstan from 1997 to 2000; and as political/consular officer in Peshawar, Pakistan. In domestic assignments she served as desk officer for Kazakhstan from 2003 to 2004 and for Georgia in the Bureau of European and Eurasian Affairs from 2001 to 2002, and staff assistant for the special envoy for the Newly-Independent States at the Department of State from 2000 to 2001.

On August 26, 2008, while stationed as principal officer in Peshawar, she was attacked by gunmen who sprayed her automobile with bullets, shooting out the front tires. Tracy, her bodyguard and driver all escaped. The Secretary's Award for Heroism recognized her quick thinking, her return to the post on the day, and her dedication to complete her mission even in the face of repeated threats to her life.

Tracy served as director for Central Asia at the National Security Council from 2011 to 2012. From 2012 to 2014 she was deputy assistant secretary for Central Asia in the Bureau of South and Central Asian Affairs. From 2014 to 2017 Tracy served as the deputy chief of mission at the embassy in Moscow, Russia. In 2017 Tracy received a Distinguished Honor Award for her contribution as deputy chief of mission in Moscow.

United States ambassador to Armenia
On September 28, 2018, President Donald Trump nominated Tracy as United States ambassador to Armenia, and she was confirmed by the Senate on January 2, 2019. Tracy's approval was preceded by intense questioning by Senators Bob Menendez and Ed Markey about U.S. policy with regard to Turkey's denial of the Armenian genocide. She was sworn in as ambassador in February 2019. Tracy presented her credentials on March 1. She left office on December 20, 2022.

United States ambassador to Russia

Tracy was nominated by President Joe Biden on September 20, 2022, for the ambassadorship to Russia. Ambassador John Sullivan left Moscow on September 4, 2022, and stated he would retire. Hearings on her nomination were held before the Senate Foreign Relations Committee on November 30, 2022. The committee favorably reported her nomination to the Senate floor on December 7, 2022. Her nomination was confirmed by the United States Senate on December 21, 2022 by a 93–2 vote. She was sworn in on January 9, 2023, and presented her credentials at the end of that month.

Personal
Tracy speaks Russian.

See also
Ambassadors of the United States

References

External links

21st-century American diplomats
21st-century American women
Ambassadors of the United States to Armenia
American women ambassadors
Living people
University of Akron alumni
University of Georgia alumni
United States Foreign Service personnel
Year of birth missing (living people)
American women diplomats